Burton Lake may refer to:

Lake Burton, Antarctica
Burton Lake (Georgia)
Yellow Medicine County, Minnesota